New Attitude  is an American sitcom that aired on ABC from August to September 1990. Based on the play Beauty Shop by Shelly Garrett, the series aired for six episodes during ABC's TGIF lineup on Fridays.

Synopsis
The St. James sisters had sunk everything they could beg or borrow into their new business venture, "New Attitude" beauty salon. The partnership was 50-50: outrageous, try-anything Yvonne (Phyllis Yvonne Stickney) got them into trouble, and conservative, sensible Vicki (Sheryl Lee Ralph) got them out. Lamarr (Morris Day) is their colorful top hairdresser, the "prince of perms"; Taylor (Karen Bankhead), the ambitious but inept receptionist (she had flunked the beautician's exam 11 times); and Leon (Earl Billings), the landlord.

New Attitude aired a total of six episodes (eight were filmed) before being canceled by ABC in September 1990.

Cast
 Sheryl Lee Ralph as Vicki St. James
 Phyllis Yvonne Stickney as Yvonne St. James
 Bebe Drake as BeBe
 Morris Day as Lamarr
 Karen Bankhead as Taylor
 Larenz Tate as Chilly D.

Episodes

References

External links
 

1990 American television series debuts
1990 American television series endings
1990s American black sitcoms
1990s American sitcoms
American Broadcasting Company original programming
Television series by Castle Rock Entertainment
English-language television shows
TGIF (TV programming block)
Television series based on plays
Television shows set in Los Angeles